The Ebenezer Chapel is a Baptist place of worship in the town of Melksham in the English county of Wiltshire. The chapel was built in 1835. It has been a Grade II listed building since 1985.

References

External links

Churches completed in 1835
19th-century Baptist churches
Strict Baptist chapels
Baptist churches in Wiltshire
19th-century churches in the United Kingdom
Melksham